Tennis, for the 2013 Island Games, took place at the William Joell Tennis Stadium in Pembroke Parish, Bermuda. Matches were played out from 14 to 19 July 2013.

Medal table

Events
 2013 IG Tennis Results Page

References

2013 Island Games
2013 in tennis
2013